Rupa Rani Tirkey (born 1987) is a female international lawn bowler from India.

Bowls career

Commonwealth Games
Tirkey has represented India at four Commonwealth Games in the triples at the 2010 Commonwealth Games, the triples and fours at the 2014 Commonwealth Games, in the pairs and fours at the 2018 Commonwealth Games and in the triples and fours at the 2022 Commonwealth Games. In the 2018 competition the Women's fours won section B and just failed out on winning a medal after losing to Malta in the quarter finals. In the 2022 competition, she was part of the Women's fours Indian team, along with (Lovely Choubey, Pinki Singh and Nayanmoni Saikia) which won the gold medal beating South Africa in the final, 17-10.

World Championships
In 2020 she was selected for the 2020 World Outdoor Bowls Championship in Australia.

Asia Pacific Championships
Tirkey has won three medals at the Asia Pacific Bowls Championships; the latest medal success was a bronze medal at the 2019 Asia Pacific Bowls Championships in the Gold Coast, Queensland.

Asian Championships 
In the Asian Lawn Bowls Championship, Tirkey has won bronze medal in women's triples in 2014 followed by silver in women's triples and bronze in women's fours, both in 2016.

In 2023, she won the fours gold medal at the 14th Asian Lawn Bowls Championship in Kuala Lumpur.

References

Living people
1987 births
Indian bowls players
People from Ranchi
Sportswomen from Jharkhand
Bowls players at the 2010 Commonwealth Games
Bowls players at the 2014 Commonwealth Games
Bowls players at the 2018 Commonwealth Games
Bowls players at the 2022 Commonwealth Games
Commonwealth Games gold medallists for India
Commonwealth Games medallists in lawn bowls
Indian sportspeople
Medallists at the 2022 Commonwealth Games